István Berde (born 14 December 1988 in Sfântu Gheorghe) is a Romanian professional footballer of Hungarian ethnicity, who plays as a midfielder.  From 2013 to 2015, he spent time in Romania. He did not play any professional football during this time.

Honours
Csíkszereda
Liga III: 2018–19

Notes

1988 births
Living people
People from Sfântu Gheorghe
Romanian sportspeople of Hungarian descent
Hungarian footballers
Romanian footballers
Association football midfielders
Nemzeti Bajnokság I players
Nemzeti Bajnokság II players
Győri ETO FC players
Gyirmót FC Győr players
BKV Előre SC footballers
Szeged-Csanád Grosics Akadémia footballers
BFC Siófok players
FK Csíkszereda Miercurea Ciuc players
Romanian expatriate footballers
Expatriate footballers in Hungary
Romanian expatriate sportspeople in Hungary